4-Methylpentedrone (also known as 4-MPD and 4-Methyl-α-methylamino-valerophenone), is a stimulant drug of the cathinone class that has been sold online as a designer drug. It is a higher homolog of 4-methylmethcathinone (mephedrone) and 4-methylbuphedrone (4-MeMABP), and the p-methyl derivative of pentedrone. It can also be viewed as the methylamino analog of pyrovalerone.

A related compound, 4-methyl-α-ethylaminopentiophenone (4-MEAP), has been found to be incorrectly sold as 4-methylpentedrone.

See also 
 Buphedrone
 Substituted cathinone

References 

Cathinones
Designer drugs
Norepinephrine–dopamine reuptake inhibitors